Opicino Spinola  (also called Opizzino Spinola) was a merchant and political leader in the Republic of Genoa in the early fourteenth century.  He was a member of the Spinola Family and one of the richest men in Genoa.

In January 1306, the citizens of Genoa replaced their Podesta with two Capitani del Popolo ("Captains of the People") as rulers of the republic, part of a constitutional struggle lasting from 1257 to 1339.

Thanks to his wealth, Spinola was elected one of the Captains.

In 1307, Spinola's daughter, Argentina Spinola, married Theodore Palaiologos, who claimed the March of Montferrat in succession to his maternal uncle. Spinola used his wealth to establish Theodore in power.

Spinola's co-Captain Bernabo Doria was the father-in-law of Manfred IV, Marquess of Saluzzo, who claimed some of the territory of Montferrat. This led to conflicts between Spinola and Doria. In 1310, Spinola managed to get himself appointed the sole Captain of the People for life.

However, his growing power made enemies, including even some of his Spinola kinsmen. In late 1310, he was forced from office; in 1311 the Podesta was restored, and Spinola was placed under perpetual banishment from Genoa.

Sources
Epstain, Steve. Genoa and the Genoese. p. 325.
Malleson, George Bruce. Studies in Genoese History. p. 300

Spinola family
Italian untitled nobility
Politicians from Genoa
14th-century Genoese people
14th-century Italian businesspeople